Leech Lake Tribal College (LLTC) is a public tribal land-grant community college in Cass Lake, Minnesota.  It was established in 1990 and designated a land-grant college in 1994. The college includes approximately 70 faculty, staff, administrators, and 250 students. Most students come from the Leech Lake and Red Lake Reservations, and approximately 8% of the student population is non-Indian.

History
The Leech Lake Tribal Council established LLTC in July 1990. For two years, courses were offered in extension from the University of Minnesota Duluth, Bemidji State University, Itasca Community College and Central Lakes College (then known as Brainerd Community College). In the fall quarter of 1992, LLTC began offering its own courses leading toward the Associate of Arts and the Associate of Applied Science degrees.

In 1994, the college was designated a land-grant college alongside 31 other tribal colleges. That same year, 17 graduates completed their Associate of Arts degrees and Associate of Applied Science degrees. By the spring of 1995, the number of graduates had increased to 24. The 2007–08 academic year saw record student enrollment; the 2008 graduating class was the largest in LLTC history.

Campus
LLTC is located on the Leech Lake Indian Reservation in north central Minnesota, three miles northwest of the town of Cass Lake. The campus houses two academic wings, a library with a Learning Center and computer lab, three technical training buildings, and a community garden, among other facilities.  The campus covers approximately 22 acres of leased land.

LLTC originally held classes in available buildings throughout the city of Cass Lake and towns throughout the Leech Lake Reservation, including a log cabin adjacent to MN HWY 2, an old church, and random houses in Cass Lake. The college moved classrooms and administration to the former Cass Lake High School building in the fall of 1994. In 2005, the College moved to its current location 3 miles west of Cass Lake. In 2015, the College opened a $2.7 million community library, Bezhigoogahbow Library, named after the College founder and first President, Larry P. Aitken.

Today, LLTC includes approximately 70 faculty, staff, administrators, and 250 full-time students. Most students come from the Leech Lake Reservation and surrounding reservations in northern Minnesota. Approximately 8% of the students enrolled at the College are non-Native American.

Partnerships
The College was accredited as a vocational school in 1993. The College was awarded candidacy status with the Higher Learning Commission of the North Central Association in 2002, and in April 2006 the Higher Learning Commission bestowed full accreditation on LLTC.

LLTC is a member of the American Indian Higher Education Consortium (AIHEC). LLTC generally serves geographically isolated populations.

The LLTC is a member of the National Association of Land Grant Institutions. The LLTC receives its base funding from the Bureau of Indian Affairs under the authority of the Tribally Controlled Community College Act (Title I, P.L. 95-471).

The College has articulation agreements and partnerships with Bemidji State University, Augsburg College, University of Minnesota Duluth, Metropolitan State University, Hibbing Community College, University of North Dakota, and others.

Governance
The Leech Lake Tribal Council adopted the original LLTC Charter in 1999 and established an independent Board of Trustees. In 2003, Leech Lake Tribal College separated from the Tribal Council and assumed its own accounting and human resources functions. The IRS has granted 501(c)(3) status to LLTC as a non-profit educational entity. While separately incorporated today, LLTC still enjoys a vital relationship with tribal government and receives about 11% of its annual funding from the Leech Lake Tribal Council.

Athletics
LLTC competes as the Lakers within the Northern Intercollegiate Athletic Conference.

Notable staff, faculty, and alumni
 Elaine Fleming, Arts and Humanities Department, Former Mayor City of Cass Lake, Minnesota
 Bob Jourdain, Arts and Humanities Department, First Language Speaker

References

External links
 Official website

Community colleges in Minnesota
Educational institutions established in 1990
Education in Cass County, Minnesota
Buildings and structures in Cass County, Minnesota
American Indian Higher Education Consortium
Two-year colleges in the United States
1990 establishments in Minnesota